Rahul Roy is an Indian politician from the state of Assam. He is a former member of Assam Legislative Assembly for Algapur, serving from 2006 to 2011. He is a former member of Indian National Congress, but is currently independent. He unsuccessfully sought reelection in Algapur in 2011, and in 2016. In 2021, he unsuccessfully sought the Udharbond seat, but was the richest candidate in the election. He is the son of former minister Gautam Roy, son of former member of Assam Legislative Assembly Mandira Roy, grandson of former member of Assam Legislative Assembly Santosh Kumar Roy and is married to Daisy Roy who was an independent candidate for the Algapur seat in 2021.

References 

Indian National Congress politicians from Assam
Assam MLAs 2006–2011
Indian politicians
Year of birth missing (living people)
Living people
People from Hailakandi district